Jeff Jonathan Mills (born October 8, 1968) is a former American football linebacker who played four seasons in the National Football League with the San Diego Chargers and Denver Broncos. He was drafted by the San Diego Chargers in the third round of the 1990 NFL Draft. He played college football at the University of Nebraska–Lincoln and attended Montclair High School in Montclair, New Jersey. Mills was also a member of the New York Giants.

References

External links
Just Sports Stats

1968 births
Living people
Players of American football from New Jersey
American football linebackers
African-American players of American football
Nebraska Cornhuskers football players
San Diego Chargers players
Denver Broncos players
Montclair High School (New Jersey) alumni
People from Montclair, New Jersey
21st-century African-American people
20th-century African-American sportspeople
New York Giants players